Thomas Ring Petersen (born 17 February 1980 in Copenhagen, Denmark), better known as Thomas Ring or simply as Thomas, is a Danish singer who rose to fame as the winner of the third Danish series of The X Factor.

Thomas started as table tennis player reaching the national level by the age of 17. When he turned 18, he got a guitar for birthday and Christmas present from his parents, Berit and Ib. He soon started writing lyrics and music leaving table tennis. He graduated from Falkonergårdens Gymnasium and is a qualified teacher at Københavns Dag- og Aftenseminarium (KDAS).

In 2017, Thomas competed in Dansk Melodi Grand Prix 2017 with the song, "Vesterbro". but he did not advance to the superfinal.

Performances during X Factor

Discography

Albums

Singles

References

External links

1980 births
The X Factor winners
Living people
Musicians from Copenhagen
21st-century Danish male  singers